Ivan Leon Franjić (born 8 September 1997) is a German professional footballer who plays as a midfielder for Würzburger Kickers.

Club career
In January 2019, Franjić agreed the termination of his contract with Eintracht Braunschweig.

On 31 January 2019, Franjić signed with 1. FC Saarbrücken for one-and-a-half years. Six months later, on 9 August 2019, Franjić joined Danish 1st Division club Næstved BK.

Franjić joined recently relegated Regionalliga Bayern club Würzburger Kickers on 3 June 2022.

References

External links
 
 German career stats - FuPa

1997 births
Living people
People from Altenkirchen
German people of Croatian descent
Footballers from Rhineland-Palatinate
Association football midfielders
German footballers
VFC Plauen players
VfB Germania Halberstadt players
Eintracht Braunschweig players
1. FC Saarbrücken players
Næstved Boldklub players
FSV Frankfurt players
Würzburger Kickers players
Regionalliga players
3. Liga players
Danish 1st Division players
German expatriate footballers
Expatriate men's footballers in Denmark
German expatriate sportspeople in Denmark